The following is a list of awards and nominations received by American filmmaker Steven Spielberg. 

Spielberg is an American film director, producer, and screenwriter. He began his career in the New Hollywood era and is currently the most commercially successful director. Spielberg is the recipient of various awards including three Academy Awards (with two for Best Director), two British Academy Film Awards, twelve Emmy Awards, nine Golden Globe Awards, three Directors Guild of America Awards, and seven Producers Guild of America Awards. He also received a Kennedy Center honor, a Cecil B. DeMille Award, and an AFI Life Achievement Award.

Spielberg is known for such blockbuster films as Jaws (1975), Close Encounters of the Third Kind (1977), E.T. the Extra-Terrestrial (1982), Jurassic Park (1993) and the Indiana Jones series (1981-present). Spielberg later explored drama in The Color Purple (1985) and Empire of the Sun (1987). Spielberg cemented his status as a serious filmmaker with the holocaust drama Schindler's List (1993), and the World War II epic Saving Private Ryan  (1998). Spielberg continued in the 2000s with science fiction, including A.I. Artificial Intelligence (2001), Minority Report (2002) and War of the Worlds (2005). He has since directed several fantasy films including The Adventures of Tintin (2011), and Ready Player One (2018), the historical dramas War Horse (2011), Lincoln (2012), Bridge of Spies (2015), The Post (2017), and the musical West Side Story (2021).

Major Awards

Academy Awards

BAFTA Awards

Golden Globe Awards

Emmy Awards

Guild awards

Directors Guild of America Awards

Producers Guild of America Awards

Writers Guild of America Awards

International awards

Berlin International Film Festival

Cannes Film Festival

César Award

Toronto International Film Festival

Venice Film Festival

Critics awards

Boston Society of Film Critics Awards

Chicago Film Critics Association Awards

Critics' Choice Awards

Dallas-Fort Worth Film Critics Association Awards

Kansas City Film Critics Circle Awards

Las Vegas Film Critics Society Awards

London Critics Circle Film Awards

Los Angeles Film Critics Association Awards

National Board of Review Awards

National Society of Film Critics Awards

New York Film Critics Circle Awards

Online Film Critics Society Awards

Southeastern Film Critics Association Awards

Toronto Film Critics Association Awards

Washington DC Film Critics Association

Miscellaneous awards

Amanda Award

American Film Institute

American Movie Awards

AACTA International Awards

Avoriaz International Fantastic Film Festival

Blue Ribbon Award

Christopher Award

Czech Lions

David di Donatello Awards

European Film Awards

Fantasporto

Fotogramas de Plata

Golden Eagle Awards

Hochi Film Awards

Hugo Award

International Online Film Critics' Poll

Italian National Syndicate of Film Journalists

Kinema Junpo Awards

Mainichi Film Concours

Retirement Research Foundation

Rembrandt Awards

Russian Guild of Film Critics

Robert Festival

Sant Jordi Awards

Satellite Awards

Saturn Awards

SFX Awards

Western Heritage Awards

Honors and achievements

Directed Academy Award performances

Other lifetime honors
1987 Distinguished Eagle Scout Award
1998 Order of Merit of the Federal Republic of Germany
1999 Department of Defense Medal for Distinguished Public Service
2001 Knight Commander of the Order of the British Empire (Honorary)
2003 Knight Grand Cross Order of Merit of the Italian Republic
2004 Knight, Legion of Honour
2005 Science Fiction Hall of Fame, the inaugural "Film, Television, and Media" induction
2006 Kennedy Center Honors
2008 Officer, Legion of Honour
2009 Liberty Medal
2011 Commander, Order of the Crown (Belgium)
2013 Israel: President's Medal
2015 United States: Presidential Medal of Freedom

Notes

References

awards
Spielberg, Steven